Boéna is a town in the Boudry Department of Ganzourgou Province in central Burkina Faso. The town has a population of 8,094.

References

Populated places in the Plateau-Central Region
Ganzourgou Province